The West Palm Beach Braves were a Minor League Baseball team that operated from 1965 to 1968, based in West Palm Beach, Florida. The team was an affiliate of the Braves franchise of Major League Baseball (MLB)—the major-league Braves were based in Milwaukee from 1953 to 1965, and Atlanta thereafter. The minor-league Braves played in the Florida State League and their ballpark was Connie Mack Field.

Year-by-year record

See also
West Palm Beach Braves players
West Palm Beach Indians, an earlier team in West Palm Beach
West Palm Beach Expos, a later team in West Palm Beach

References

Defunct Florida State League teams
Baseball teams established in 1965
Atlanta Braves minor league affiliates
Sports clubs disestablished in 1968
1965 establishments in Florida
1968 disestablishments in Florida
Sports in West Palm Beach, Florida
Defunct baseball teams in Florida
Baseball teams disestablished in 1968